Richard Ringer (born 27 February 1989 in Überlingen) is a German athlete specialising in long-distance and cross-country running. He won the bronze medal at the 2013 Summer Universiade, and finished fourth at the 2014 European Championships and fifth at the 2015 European Indoor Championships. His greatest success is his victory in the Marathon at the 2022 European Championships in Munich.

Competition record

Personal bests
Outdoor
1500 metres – 3:44.29 (Madrid 2014)
3000 metres – 7:50.99 (Braunschweig 2014)
5000 metres – 13:25.24 (Berlin 2014)
10,000 metres – 27:36.52 (London 2018)
Indoor
1500 metres – 3:45.40 (Stuttgart 2011)
3000 metres – 7:46.18 (Karlsruhe 2015)

References

1989 births
Living people
People from Überlingen
Sportspeople from Tübingen (region)
German male long-distance runners
Olympic male long-distance runners
Olympic athletes of Germany
Athletes (track and field) at the 2016 Summer Olympics
Universiade medalists in athletics (track and field)
Universiade bronze medalists for Germany
Medalists at the 2013 Summer Universiade
World Athletics Championships athletes for Germany
European Athletics Championships winners
German national athletics champions
Athletes (track and field) at the 2020 Summer Olympics
20th-century German people
21st-century German people